Microlunatus  is a Gram-positive, non-spore-forming, mesophilic, aerobic and non-motile bacterial genus from the family of Propionibacteriaceae.

References

Further reading 
 
 

Propionibacteriales
Bacteria genera